Nalanda was an acclaimed Mahavihara, a large Buddhist monastery in ancient Magadha (modern-day Bihar), India.

Nalanda may also refer to:

Nalanda district, an administrative district of Bihar, India
Nalanda (Lok Sabha constituency), a Lok Sabha constituency
Nalanda Gedige, an ancient temple in Sri Lanka
Nalanda, a village in Matale District, Sri Lanka
Nalanda (genus), a beetle genus

Education
Nalanda Central College, Minuwangoda, a boys' school in Minuwangoda, Sri Lanka
Nalanda College Biharsharif, a college in Bihar Sharif, Bihar, India
Nalanda College, Colombo, a school in Colombo, Sri Lanka
Nalanda Girls' Central College, a girls' school in Minuwangoda, Sri Lanka
Nalanda Maha Vidyalaya, Elpitiya, a school in Elpitiya, Sri Lanka
Nalanda Open University, a university at Patna, Bihar, India
Nalanda University, a.k.a. Nalanda International University, a university (opened 2014) near the ruins of Nalanda, Bihar, India
The Karma Shri Nalanda Institute for Higher Buddhist Studies at Rumtek monastery, an affiliate of Sampurnanand Sanskrit University in Varanasi, India
Nalanda Monastery (France), a Tibetan Buddhist center affiliated with the FPMT

See also
 All pages beginning with Nalanda